The 2010 Asian Games, officially known as the XVI Asian Games and also known as Guangzhou 2010, were a regional multi-sport event that had taken place from November 12 to November 27, 2010 in Guangzhou, Guangdong, China (although several events commenced earlier on November 7, 2010). It was the second time China hosted the Asian Games, with the first one being Asian Games 1990 in Beijing.

Guangzhou's three neighboring cities, Dongguan, Foshan and Shanwei co-hosted the Games. Premier Wen Jiabao opened the Games along the Pearl River in Haixinsha Island. A total of 53 venues were used to host the events. The design concept of the official logo of the 2010 Asian Games was based on the legend of the Guangzhou's Five Goats, representing the Five Goats as the Asian Games Torch.

A total of 9,704 athletes from 45 National Olympic Committees (NOCs) competed in 476 events of 42 sports and disciplines (28 Olympic sports and 14 non-Olympic sports), making it the largest event in the history of the Games. Due to reductions in the number of sports for competition in the 2014 Asian Games, these Games marked the final time that six non-Olympic events would be held during the Asian Games.

China led the final medal tally, followed by South Korea in second place, and Japan in third place. China set a new Games record with 199 gold medals. Three world and 103 Asian records were broken. Macau and Bangladesh won their first ever Asian Games gold medals. In addition, the badminton men's singles gold medalist Lin Dan was voted as the most valuable player (MVP). The President of the Olympic Council of Asia Sheikh Ahmed Al-Fahad Al-Ahmed Al-Sabah hailed the Games as "outstanding" and "one of the best ever."

Bidding process

Seoul and Amman dropped out before their bids were officially selected by the Olympic Council of Asia (OCA), leaving only two candidate cities—Guangzhou and Kuala Lumpur—by March 31, 2004. Seoul withdrew after considering that South Korea hosted the 2002 Games in Busan, only eight years earlier. The evaluation committee of the OCA inspected Kuala Lumpur from April 12 to 14 and Guangzhou from April 14 to 16 of 2004. On April 15, 2004, the Government of Malaysia declared that it would not support the Olympic Council of Malaysia with a Kuala Lumpur bid due to the high cost of hosting the Games, estimated at US$366 million, forcing Kuala Lumpur to withdraw its bid and leaving Guangzhou as the sole bidder. The OCA unanimously selected Guangzhou to host the 2010 Games during their 23rd General Assembly session in Doha, Qatar, site of the 2006 Asian Games, on July 1, 2004.

Development and preparations

Costs
On March 11, 2005, Lin Shusen, then party secretary of the Guangzhou Municipal Committee of the Chinese Communist Party (CCP) said the Games "will not cost more than ￥2 billion",
in stark contrast to an earlier report, which had claimed that the cost could exceed ￥200 billion.

In March 2009, the director of the marketing department of the Games, Fang Da'er, claimed that the Games were short of funds, due to the lack of sponsorship and the global financial crisis. An informal estimate put the Games' expenditure at about US$420 million and revenue at US$450 million.

On October 13, 2010, Wan Qingliang, mayor of Guangzhou at the time, officially revealed in a press conference that the total cost of staging the Asian Games and Asian Para Games is about ￥122.6 billion ($18.37 billion), with ￥109 billion spent on the city's infrastructure, ￥6.3 billion on the venues and some ￥7.3 billion spent on the Games' operations.

The full spending details would be released before 2013, according to the city's finance chief Zhang Jieming. It was later reported that Guangzhou generated US$32 billion (￥210 billion) debt after staging the games.

Volunteers
Volunteer recruitment program for the 2010 Asian Games began at 9 pm on April 21, 2009, with a target of 60,000 games-time volunteers. The volunteers were given a green short-sleeve t-shirt, a green long-sleeve t-shirt, a sport jacket, a pair of trousers, a hat, a water bottle, a pair of sport shoes and a waist bag.

Torch relay

Two torch designs were shortlisted in September 2009 for the 2010 Asian Games. A design named "The Tide" was chosen over one named "Exploit" by the organizers as the torch of the Games. "The Tide" weighs 98 g and is 70 cm long, and is tall and straight in shape, while dynamic in terms of image.

The torch relay route was unveiled on March 4, 2010, and due to budgetary issues and the problems related to 2008 Summer Olympics torch relay, the organizers decided to carry it out on a smaller scale than those carried out in previous editions. The torch was Guangdong province and was traveled across 21 major cities of the Guangdong Province. The flame of the torch was lit at the Great Wall of China on October 9, 2010, and traveled around the Temple of Heaven in Beijing. As originally scheduled 21 cities were present in the list of relay, with 2,010 torchbearers expected to carry it from October 12 to November 12, 2010; however, two more cities — Changchun in Jilin and Haiyang in Shandong, the host cities of 2007 Asian Winter Games and 2012 Asian Beach Games respectively, were also later added to the route for a single day on October 15, 2010, increasing the number of torchbearers to 2,068 people.

Marketing

Emblem

The official emblem of the Games was unveiled at Sun Yat-sen Memorial Hall on November 26, 2006, to prepare the city to succeed Doha 2006 as Asian Games host city. It is a stylized representation of Guangzhou's "Statue of the Five Goats" fused with a running track. In Chinese tradition, the goat is a blessing and brings people luck, and the host city Guangzhou is known as the "City of Goats". The orange and yellow emblem also resembles a flame.

Mascots
The mascots of the Games were five goat rams. They were unveiled on April 28, 2008, at the Guangzhou Baiyun International Convention and Exhibition Center. The five goat rams, including four small and one large, were named A Xiang, A He, A Ru, A Yi and Le Yangyang. The Chinese character "yang" (羊) or "goat" is an auspicious symbol because when read together, the Chinese names of the five rams are a message of blessing, literally meaning "Peace, Harmony and Great Happiness, with everything going as you wish.", which represents the hopes of Guangzhou people that the Games will bring peace, auspiciousness and happiness to the people of Asia.

A Xiang is described as a handsome, stylish, sincere and brave goat who wears the blue outfit that resembles the blue ring of the Olympic emblem, symbolizes the ever-running Pearl River and the gentle and kind character and broad and welcoming heart of the Guangzhou people.

A He is described as an earthy, modest, serene and decisive goat who wears the black outfit that resembles the black ring of the Olympic emblem, symbolizes the grand heritage and long history of the Lingnan culture.

A Ru is described as a beautiful, fashionable, smart and passionate goat who wears the red outfit that resembles the red ring of the Olympic emblem, symbolizes the red kapok (Bombax ceiba)—the city flower of Guangzhou and hence the nickname of Guangzhou as The City of Flowers.

A Yi is described as a nifty, cute, lively and outgoing goat who wears the green outfit that resembles the green ring of the Olympic emblem, symbolizes the city's famous Baiyun Mountain.

Le Yangyang is described as the tall, handsome, sunny and confident leader of the goat ram mascot team, who wears the yellow outfit that resembles the yellow ring of the Olympic emblem, symbolizes the color of rice spike and hence the nickname of Guangzhou as The City of Rice Spike.

Medals
The medal designs themed the "Maritime part of the Silk Road" were unveiled at Guangzhou No. 2 Children's Palace on 29 September 2010. It featured the Emblem of the Olympic Council of Asia and Guangzhou's kapok flower on the obverse and the Maritime part Silk Road image and the games' logo on the reverse. The Maritime Silk Road image depicts a Chinese boat sailing on the sea, represents Guangzhou as the starting place of Maritime part of the Silk Road, as the most important commercial center and entrepot of the Southern China, Hong Kong and Macau regions.

Motto
The official motto of the 2010 Asian Games is "Thrilling Games, Harmonious Asia". It was chosen to represent the goal of the Asian Games which is based on Olympic ideals and values, aimed at creating a competitive atmosphere for participating athletes while promoting unity, peace and friendship among Asian people regardless of differences in race, nationality, religious beliefs and language.

Promotion 
Two years before the games, "Road of Asia" tour was launched at Tianhe Sports Center to promote the games throughout the region. A ceremony was held on 12 November 2009 at the Guangzhou Gymnasium to mark the one-year milestone before the Games.

Merchandising 
Organizers started selling licensed Asian Games products with introduction of first batch in January 2008. On May 7, 2009, Southern Metropolis Daily newspaper signed a contract with the Guangzhou Asian Games Organizing Committee (GAGOC) and became the exclusive online retailer of the 16th Asiad's licensed products.

Music 
The official theme song was released on September 30, 2010, and is called "Reunion". It was composed by Wu Liqun, with lyrics written by Xu Rongkai, while the English version was translated by Chen Ning Yang, a Chinese-American physicist, and his wife, Weng Fan. The song was performed by Sun Nan and the late Yao Beina. Sun Nan also performed it again with Mao Amin for a music video. The song was selected based from a solicitation campaign for Asian Games songs which received more than 1,600 entries. 36 of them were released as selected songs for the Games.

Venues

A total of 53 competition venues and 17 training venues were used for the Games, with four venues located outside of Guangzhou. Events took place at 42 pre-existing venues; eleven competition venues and one training venue were constructed for the Games, while the rest were renovated. Other venues included the Asian Games Town, which consists of the Games Village with the Athletes, Officials and Media Buildings, the Main Media Center and International Broadcast Center.

Organizers revealed that the total investment was over ￥15 billion.

On April 19, 2009, organizers announced that they had chosen, in an unprecedented move that Haixinsha Island, along with the Pearl River, were to be the venues for the opening and closing ceremonies, this was the first time on the games history that the ceremonies are held outside from the games main venues.

The villages at the Asian Games Town was built on a 329,024 square meters land space which had 3,598 apartments in 49 buildings.

Transport

Guangzhou's public transportation infrastructure was expanded significantly as a part of the preparation for the Games. Guangzhou Baiyun International Airport had been upgraded, in contracted to Crisplant (former FKI Logistex), to support massive volume of passengers. A new Wuhan–Guangzhou High-Speed Railway was opened on December 26, 2009, shorten the travel time between two destinations.

In order to ease the traffic congestion and air pollution, the government ordered 40 percent reduction of vehicles and offered 1,000 buses during the Games and Para Games. The government also had a free-ride offer for public transportation during the month of Games, but cancelled one week prior to the Games due to overwhelming response from the citizens. Instead, government offered ￥150 cash subsidies to each household with permanent residence for commuting purposes.

The Games

Opening ceremony

The opening ceremony was held on November 12, 2010. For the first time in Asian Games history, the ceremony was not held in a traditional stadium setting. Instead, it was held at Haixinsha Island, using the Pearl River and Canton Tower as focal points. The ceremony was directed by Chen Weiya, assistant director of the 2008 Summer Olympics in Beijing, and featured a cast of about 6,000 performers. It was attended by the Chinese Premier, Wen Jiabao, President of Pakistan Asif Ali Zardari, Prime Minister of Thailand Abhisit Vejjajiva, Chief Secretary for Administration of Hong Kong Henry Tang, as well as OCA president Ahmed Al-Fahad Al-Ahmed Al-Sabah, and Jacques Rogge, president of the International Olympic Committee. The ceremony lasted for three hours, and together with the closing ceremony costed about ￥380 million ( million).

Athletes were paraded by boats along the Pearl River. The ceremony featured the water-themed arts show and culture of Guangzhou. The last torchbearer, diver He Chong lit up the cauldron, after igniting traditional Chinese firecrackers, whose flare shot up to the top of the tower where the cauldron was held.

The ceremony received positive reviews; Rogge was quoted as considering the ceremony to be "absolutely fantastic", and felt that it demonstrated the city's "ability to host the Olympics". OCA director general Husain Al-Musallam also praised the ceremony, arguing that it was unique and "just better than the Beijing Summer Olympics [opening ceremony]".

Sports
476 events were held in 42 sports (57 disciplines), including the 26 sports was to be played at the 2012 Summer Olympics, and 16 additional non-Olympic sports. This marked an increase from the 424 events in 39 sports held in 2006. The OCA approved Cricket (Twenty20) for inclusion in the main program, while events were also held in dancesport (competitive ballroom dancing), dragon boat, weiqi and roller sport were also held in Guangzhou. Bodybuilding was dropped following criticism over the quality of judging in the competition at the 2006 Games.

Participating National Olympic Committees

All 45 members of the Olympic Council of Asia that existed as of 2010 participated in the 2010 Asian Games. All National Olympic Committees were ordered to submit their entries before September 30, 2010. Organizers allowed each NOC to submit additional entries and injury replacements after the deadline. After the final registration deadline, some 9,704 athletes, as well as some 4,750 team officials, took part in the Games, an increase of 184 athletes from the previous Asian Games in Doha. According to the Games' official website, Kuwaiti athletes participated the Games under the Olympic flag because the Kuwait Olympic Committee was suspended due to political interference in January 2010.

Below is a list of all the participating NOCs; the number of competitors per delegation is indicated in brackets.

Calendar
In the following calendar for the 2010 Asian Games, each blue box represents an event competition, such as a qualification round, on that day. The yellow boxes represent days during which medal-awarding finals for a sport were held. Each bullet in these boxes is an event final, the number of bullets per box representing the number of finals that were contested on that day. On the left the calendar lists each sport with events held during the Games, and at the right how many gold medals were won in that sport. There is a key at the top of the calendar to aid the reader.

All times are in China Standard Time (UTC+8)

Closing ceremony

The closing ceremony began on November 27, 2010, at 20:06 local time in front of 35,000 spectators. The show had the theme "Leave Your Song Here", which had cultural displays from China, India, Indonesia, Lebanon, Japan, Kazakhstan and Mongolia. The ceremony featured songs from different cultures as chosen: the Indians "Saajan ji Ghar Aaye" and "Aao re Jhumo re", Indonesian "Sing Sing So" and Japanese "Sakura". Various artists from Taiwan, Hong Kong and mainland China performed "Triumphant Return", among them were Alan Tam, Leo Ku and Hacken Lee.

After awarding host badminton player Lin Dan,with the most valuable player award, President of the Olympic Council of Asia Ahmed Al-Fahad Al-Ahmed Al-Sabah officially announced the Games closed. As per tradition, the People's Liberation Army personnel has lowered the OCA flag, and carried out of the ceremony venue. Later, the South Korean flag is raised to the South Korean national anthem. The Mayor of Incheon Song Young-gil received the Games flag for as the city is scheduled to host the 2014 Games. The ceremony then proceeded with an eight-minute segment from Incheon called "Arirang Party" led by traditional percussionist Choi So-ri in Korean traditional costumes, taekwondo exponents and famous Korean singer, songwriter, dancer, record producer and actor Rain led the segment. Rain sang a medley of three of his hit-songs during the segment which were "Rainism", "Hip Song" and "Friends".

The closing ceremony ended with the flame being extinguished and the theme songs "Everyone" and "Cheer for Asia" being performed.

Medal table

China led the medal table for the eighth consecutive time with a new record for the most number of gold medals (at 199 gold medals) won in a single Games. This bettered their previous record of 183 gold medals won by China at the 1990 games. Macau, and Bangladesh won their first Asian Games gold medal from wushu and cricket, respectively. Some 35 NOCs (except Kuwait who competed under the Olympic flag) won at least a single medal with 27 NOCs winning at least a single gold medal, thus leaving nine NOCs failing to win any medal at the Games.

The top ten ranked NOCs at these Games are listed below. The host nation, China, is highlighted.

Broadcasting
Guangzhou Asian Games Broadcasting Co., Ltd (GAB), a broadcasting consortium, established on December 31, 2008, served as the host broadcaster of the games. The International Broadcast Centre was constructed within the Asian Games town.

Concerns and controversies

Sports

Cricket was among the five début sports in the Games. India, despite its historical record, decided not to send its cricket team to the Games. According to the Board of Control for Cricket in India, the decision was due to other international commitments. However, its main rivals, Pakistan and Sri Lanka, confirmed their participation.

In ten-pin bowling, the Asian Bowling Federation decided to complete the Games behind closed doors, this resulted in protests from many delegates.

On November 17, Yang Shu-chun of Chinese Taipei, was abruptly disqualified with 12 seconds left in the first round of the taekwondo competition, while leading her opponent 9–0. She was accused of having installed illegal sensors on the heel of her socks. The event quickly turned into an international incident, with officials, politicians and public opinion from Chinese Taipei, China and South Korea trading accusations of manipulation and fraud.

About 1,400 random doping tests were carried out during the Games. Two athletes tested positive; judoka Shokir Muminov on November 19, 2010, and Greco-Roman wrestler Jakhongir Muminov on November 24, 2010, both from Uzbekistan, tested positive for methylhexanamine. On January 24, 2011, the OCA announced another two doping failures, Qatari's Ahmed Dheeb who tested positive for exogenous testosterone metabolites and Palestinian Awajna Abdalnasser who tested positive for 19-Norandrosterone.

Languages
In July 2010, the citizens of Guangzhou opposed the proposal suggested by the city committee of the Chinese People's Political Consultative Conference (CPPCC) to use Mandarin more in television news programs, rather than Guangzhou's main language, Cantonese. The debates eventually led to a series of public protests.

In late October 2010, in order to protest the government over the language policy in Tibetan area, the Tibetan Youth Congress (TYC) used the games as a channel to voice their concern.

Environment
Like the 2008 Olympic Games in Beijing, Guangzhou also attempted to raise the air quality of the city. The authority had pledged ￥600 million to fight the problem, and had ordered around 32 chemical plants to stop production by the end of 2009. A report shown on July 13, 2010, indicates that the air quality was rated at 95.07% in 2009, an increase of 12.01% since 2004; this improvement eventually cost authorities ￥24 billion. Subsequent action from organizers to curb pollution included decreasing the movement of vehicles up to 40 percent and banning barbecue stalls in 11 cities.

Between 2005 and 2008 about 150 Guolang villagers survived by growing tomatoes, beans, and cabbages while fighting the government for fairer compensation after their homes were flattened for Asian games infrastructure. The Panyu government set aside a date to listen to petitioners' complaint on October 18, 2010.

Prior to the opening of the games, Conghua reported 429 cases of Norovirus outbreak. The government officials stressed that the people recovered before November 12.

See also

2008 Summer Olympics
2008 Summer Paralympics
2009 Winter Universiade
2011 Summer Universiade
List of IOC country codes

References

External links

Guangzhou 2010 at Olympic Council of Asia

 
Asian Games
Asian Games
Asian Games
Asian Games
Multi-sport events in China
Asian Games
Asian Games
2010
November 2010 sports events in China